The 2011 South Lakeland District Council election took place on 5 May 2011 to elect members of South Lakeland District Council in Cumbria, England. One third of the council was up for election and the Liberal Democrats stayed in overall control of the council.

After the election, the composition of the council was:
Liberal Democrat 32
Conservative 18
Labour 1

Background
19 seats were contested at the election over 18 wards. 2 of these were by-elections, in Levens and in 1 of the 2 seats being fought in Ambleside and Grasmere. Both the Liberal Democrats and Conservatives stood in every seat, while Labour put up 8 candidates and the Green Party 2 candidates.

Election result
The results saw the Liberal Democrats keep their majority on the council after losing 1 seat to the Conservatives. The only change came in Windermere Applethwaite and Troutbeck, with the Conservatives taking the seat by 12 votes after several recounts. This left the Liberal Democrats on 32 seats, compared to 18 for the Conservatives and 1 for Labour. Overall turnout in the election was 56.16%.

Ward results

By-Elections

References

2011
2011 English local elections
2010s in Cumbria